Morley and Outwood is a constituency represented in the House of Commons of the UK Parliament since 2015 by Andrea Jenkyns of the Conservative Party.

History

Forerunners and boundaries
The Morley and Outwood constituency was first contested in 2010. It consists of the town of Morley, in the City of Leeds metropolitan district, and around Outwood in the City of Wakefield district.  It is largely a successor to the previous Morley and Rothwell seat, which existed from 1997 until 2010; Rothwell was transferred to a new Elmet and Rothwell seat, while Outwood was previously part of the abolished Normanton constituency. At the same time, the Leeds suburb of Middleton was transferred to Leeds Central. The remainder of the former Normanton constituency was divided between the Normanton, Pontefract and Castleford constituency and the Wakefield constituency.

Political history
At the 2010 general election, Morley and Outwood was won by Ed Balls of the Labour Party, who had been MP for Normanton since 2005, and served as Labour's Shadow Chancellor of the Exchequer from 2011 to 2015.  Balls narrowly lost the seat at the 2015 general election to the Conservative Party candidate Andrea Jenkyns which was described by Larry Elliott of The Guardian as a "Portillo moment". The 2015 general election result gave the Conservatives that year their sixth-most marginal majority of their 331 seats won, by percentage of majority.  Third parties have not polled strongly in the seat to date — the combined votes of the two largest UK parties' candidates exceeded 72.9% of the total in 2010 and 2015, 97.4% in 2017, and 91.7% in 2019.

Boundaries

Parliament approved the recommendation of the Boundary Commission's Fifth Periodic Review of Westminster constituencies to create this new ("cross-border") constituency as a consequence of West Yorkshire losing one parliamentary seat following more rapid population increase in other regions.

The constituency comprises the following electoral wards:
 From the City of Leeds: Ardsley and Robin Hood; Morley North; Morley South.
 From the City of Wakefield: Stanley and Outwood East; Wrenthorpe and Outwood West.

In the September 2016 Boundary Commission constituency proposals, this seat was set to disappear and its territory split between two new constituencies: Batley and Morley; and Normanton, Castleford and Outwood.

Members of Parliament

Election results

Elections in the 2010s

See also
List of parliamentary constituencies in West Yorkshire
Leeds South East
Morley and Leeds South
Morley and Rothwell
Elmet and Rothwell

Notes

References

Politics of Leeds
Parliamentary constituencies in Yorkshire and the Humber
Constituencies of the Parliament of the United Kingdom established in 2010